Clover Township is the name of some places in the U.S. state of Minnesota:
Clover Township, Clearwater County, Minnesota
Clover Township, Hubbard County, Minnesota
Clover Township, Mahnomen County, Minnesota
Clover Township, Pine County, Minnesota

See also
Clover Township (disambiguation)

Minnesota township disambiguation pages